CFTA-FM is a community radio station which operates at 107.9 MHz (FM) in Amherst, Nova Scotia, Canada. The station is branded as Tantramar FM.

History
On September 11, 2008, Tantramar Community Radio Society was denied a licence to operate a new community radio station at Amherst. On June 15, 2009, Tantramar Community Radio Society received Canadian Radio-television and Telecommunications Commission (CRTC) approval to operate a new FM community radio station at Amherst. The new station would operate at 107.9 MHz (channel 300B1), with an effective radiated power of 6,500 watts (non-directional antenna/effective height of antenna above average terrain of 123 metres).

On July 21, 2011, at 1:07pm, CFTA-FM 107.9 signed on the air with a test broadcast.

References

External links
tantramarfm.ca - official website.
 

Fta
Fta
Radio stations established in 2009
2009 establishments in Nova Scotia
Amherst, Nova Scotia